is a Japanese politician of the New Komeito Party, a member of the House of Representatives in the Diet (national legislature). He was born in Tianjin, China during the time part of China was under Japanese occupation. A graduate of the University of Tokyo, he was elected to the House of Representatives for the first time in 1983. From August 1993 to April 1994, he served as Minister of Posts and Telecommunications in Morihiro Hosokawa's cabinet.

Kanzaki was the Komeito's leader when the party entered into the coalition in October 1999 with the Liberal Democratic Party which it still maintains to this day. Kanzaki was a noted critic of Prime Minister Yoshirō Mori. Around the time some members of the LDP were voicing opposition to a local referendum which expressed opposition to a proposed dam project along the Yoshino River, Kanzaki insisted that the voters' decision should be respected fully. In 2001, he stated his support for allowing married couples to retain separate surnames.

He stepped down as party leader in 2006 and became an advisor instead. Although Komeito suffered a heavy blow in the 2009 general election along with its coalition partner, Kanzaki was able to secure a position in the Diet thanks to the Kyushu PR block results. He retired from the Diet in 2010 due to kidney failure, but remained a permanent advisor to his party.

References

External links 
 Official website in Japanese.

1943 births
Living people
Politicians from Tianjin
People from Fukuoka
University of Tokyo alumni
Japanese prosecutors
20th-century Japanese lawyers
Members of the House of Representatives (Japan)
Government ministers of Japan
New Komeito politicians
Members of Sōka Gakkai